Icabpur is a village near Kailashahar in North Tripura district of Tripura state of India.

References

Villages in North Tripura district